WQ or Wq may refer to:
 Wq numbers, in the catalogues of the works of composer Carl Philipp Emanuel Bach, compiled by Alfred Wotquenne
 Wake Island, in the western Pacific Ocean
 Water quality
 Wiscasset and Quebec Railroad, in Maine, US
 Wikiquote, a Wikimedia Foundation online project